Gilles Clouzeau is a French slalom canoeist who competed in the late 1980s and early 1990s. He won two medals at the ICF Canoe Slalom World Championships with a gold (K1 team: 1991) and a silver (K1: 1989).

World Cup individual podiums

References

French male canoeists
Living people
Year of birth missing (living people)
Medalists at the ICF Canoe Slalom World Championships